Ericameria juarezensis is a plant species in the family Asteraceae, found only in the mountains of northern Baja California.

Ericameria juarezensis is a branching shrub up to 60 cm (2 feet) tall and 120 cm (4 feet) across. Stems can be as much as 3 cm (1.2 inches) in diameter at the base, with gray-brown, shedding bark. Leaves are obovate or oblanceolate, with no teeth on the edges. Flower heads are yellow, sometimes with as many as 26 disc florets but no ray florets.

References

juarezensis
Flora of Baja California
Endemic flora of Mexico
Natural history of the California chaparral and woodlands
Natural history of the Peninsular Ranges
Plants described in 1969
Taxa named by Reid Venable Moran